A packet  is a small bag or pouch, made from paper, foil, plastic film or another type of packing material, often used to contain single-use quantities of foods or consumer goods such as ketchup or shampoo. Packets are commonly opened by making a small rip or tear in part of the package, and then squeezing out the contents.

Uses 

Condiments distributed in packets include ketchup, mustard, mayonnaise, salad cream, HP sauce, relish, tartar sauce, vinegar and soy sauce. They provide a simple and low-cost way of distributing small amounts of condiment with ready-to-eat packaged food such as hot dogs, French fries, or hamburgers, and are common in fast food restaurants. The packets produce less contamination and mess than freely available condiments dispensed into small disposable cups or other containers, especially if the food will be in transit before dining.  Potpourri fragrances are also sold in sachets.  Potpourri sachet envelopes are filled with scented herbs and flowers or use vermiculite containing aromatic fragrance oil.  These are known as potpourri wardrobe sachets. In Argentina and Uruguay, milk and yogurts are also sold in packets.

In 1983, the Indian company Cavin Kare began selling shampoo in small plastic packets instead of large bottles in order to make it more affordable to the poor. Sale of small amounts of shampoo and detergents in plastic packets is very popular throughout the Philippines, India and other Eastern countries. In 2011, 87% of shampoo sold in India was in sachets.

Porous pouch

Some packets are made of materials with known porosity to allow vapors from the pouch to escape.  These pouches, also called sachets, can be placed in other packages to help control the atmosphere.  Uses include: volatile corrosion inhibitors, 
desiccants, oxygen scavengers, etc.

History 
Benjamin Eisenstadt invented a machine that produced the modern sugar packet after a failed endeavor to package and sell tea bags, later packaging other items, including sauces.

Variants 

The Sanford Redmond designed the no mess dispenSRpak for one handed operation. Introduced into Australia in 1990, it is used in other countries, but the design has not been widely licensed in the USA.

In 2010, the H. J. Heinz Company designed a new ketchup packet. The new design was made with a cup and easy tear, thus making it easier to dip food without a plate along with holding three times as much ketchup. It has not been widely adopted.

Water sachets

Records 

In Collinsville, Illinois, the largest ketchup packet was created by H. J. Heinz Company for a fundraiser for the Collinsville Christian Academy. People could buy a bottle of ketchup for $1 to add to the ketchup packet.

Annual production of ketchup packets by Heinz alone is 11 billion.

See also 
 Dip & Squeeze
 Sugar packet
Teabag
Bindle

References

Further reading 
 Yam, K. L., "Encyclopedia of Packaging Technology", John Wiley & Sons, 2009, 

Bags
Fast food
Food packaging
Single-serve containers